The 2008 ICC World Cricket League Africa Region Division Two was a cricket tournament in Benoni, South Africa, taking place between 4 August and 9 October 2008. It gave six African Associate and Affiliate members of the International Cricket Council experience of international one-day cricket and formed part of the global World Cricket League structure.

Botswana, the top team, was promoted to Division 1 and the 2009 Global Division 6 while Nigeria qualified for the 2009 Global Division 7.

Teams

There were 6 teams that played in the tournament. These teams were non-test member nations of the African Cricket Association. The teams that played were:

Squads

Group stage

Points Table

Fixtures

Statistics

International cricket competitions in 2008
World Cricket League Africa Region
International cricket competitions in South Africa